is a Japanese former professional sumo wrestler from Hokkaidō. He was the sport's 61st yokozuna and won eight top division championships. He wrestled for Kokonoe stable, as did Chiyonofuji, and the two were the first yokozuna stablemates to take part in a play-off for the championship, in 1989. After a number of injury problems he retired in 1992, and is now the head coach of Hakkaku stable. In November 2015 he was appointed chairman of the Japan Sumo Association, following the death of Kitanoumi, initially to serve until the end of March 2016. He was then elected as head for a full term by his fellow board members in a vote held in March 2016, and was re-elected in 2018, 2020 and 2022.

Early life
Hoshi was born in Hiroo, Hokkaidō. An uncle was an acquaintance of former yokozuna Kitanofuji, who by then had retired from competition and was running Kokonoe stable, and at his invitation Hoshi moved to Tokyo. Upon leaving school, his first appearance in the ring was March 1979, aged just 15, using his real name as his shikona or ring name. Also starting at the same time was future yokozuna Futahaguro.

Makuuchi
It took him four years to reach the second-highest jūryō division in March 1983, aged 19, the same time as fellow Tokachi district rival Ōnokuni entered the top division. By this time his stablemate Chiyonofuji had been promoted to yokozuna. Hokutoumi made his debut in the top makuuchi division in September 1983.

In March 1986 at the sekiwake rank he won his first yūshō or tournament championship with a record of thirteen wins and two losses. Despite this impressive result he was not immediately promoted to the second-highest ōzeki rank as he had not done particularly well in the previous two tournaments, only managing 30 wins in the most recent three tournaments when 33 is generally required. It also did not help his cause that there were already five ōzeki, leaving the Sumo Association with no incentive to loosen the promotion criteria. However, he carried on producing excellent results with an 11–4 in May, and then went 12–3 in July, securing his promotion for the September tournament. Futahaguro was promoted to yokozuna at the same time.

At this point, his coach decided a new ring name was appropriate. He wished to acknowledge his home district of Tokachi, but the kanji for it literally means "ten wins" and it was felt that this might be bad luck, limiting his wins in any tournament to ten. As a compromise he adopted the surname Hokutoumi, taking  ("win") from the second kanji in Tokachi, but pronouncing it to like the first kanji in the district's name. He also changed the spelling of Nobuyoshi back to his legal way.

Yokozuna
After his second tournament title in March 1987 and a runner-up performance in May, he was promoted to yokozuna for the July tournament. In 1988 he suffered a severe back injury which kept him out of three tournaments. It also appeared he would miss the start of the January 1989 tournament, but it was delayed due to the death of the emperor, and he went on to win the tournament. He also won the May tournament. In July, he took part in an historic play-off with Chiyonofuji – the first time ever that two yokozuna from the same stable had met in the ring (the rules of sumo state that wrestlers from the same stable can only fight each other in a play-off).

On the last day of the March 1990 tournament, he fought in a rare three-way play-off with ōzeki Konishiki and sekiwake Kirishima. In a play-off, wrestlers fight each other in turn, the first to win two consecutive bouts winning the tournament. First, Hokutoumi fought Konishiki and lost. Konishiki was then drawn up against Kirishima. Konishiki only needed to win this bout for the tournament, but Kirishima won. Next was Kirishima against Hokutoumi, Kirishima needing just this bout for his first yūshō. Hokutoumi won. Hokutoumi then beat Konishiki in the next bout, thus winning the tournament.

On the fourteenth day of the March 1991 tournament, he injured his left knee during a bout with Ōnokuni, but managed to go on to win the tournament with 13 wins. After this, Hokutoumi had many absences due to his knee. In October 1991 he was awarded the Japan Festival Trophy after winning an exhibition tournament at the Royal Albert Hall in London. At the start of 1991 there were four yokozuna, but Chiyonofuji retired in May 1991, Ōnokuni in July and Asahifuji in January of the next year (1992), leaving Hokutoumi the sole yokozuna. Left with this responsibility he struggled on, but he withdrew from the March 1992 tournament after losing his first two matches to Mitoizumi and Kushimaumi, and announced his retirement shortly before the May 1992 tournament at the age of 28 years and 10 months. Citing shoulder, elbow and knee injuries, he said he had "lost my fighting spirit to continue training." In the space of just one year, all four yokozuna had retired. Hokutoumi had fought 29 basho as yokozuna. Following his retirement, there were no yokozuna on the banzuke for the first time in 60 years, and sumo went without one for the next eight months, until the promotion of Akebono in January 1993.

Retirement from the ring
Following his retirement Hokutoumi became a member of the Japan Sumo Association with the toshiyori name Hakkaku-oyakata. He opened up his own training stable, Hakkaku stable, which has had four top division wrestlers, Hokutōriki, Kaihō, Okinoumi, and Hokutofuji.

He occasionally appears on NHK sumo broadcasts as a commentator and analyst.

On December 18, 2015, he was appointed chairman of the Japan Sumo Association, after former chairman Kitanoumi died in office on November 20, 2015. He had been serving as an executive director of the board under Kitanoumi since 2012. His appointment lasted until the end of March 2016. He then won a contested ballot on March 28, 2016, defeating Takanohana, and was confirmed for a further two-year term. He was re-elected for additional two-year terms in 2018, 2020 and 2022.

Taking advantage of his abundant work experience and broad perspective, such as the general manager of the public relations department and the general manager of the business department, he implemented various reforms and fan services as the chairman. In January 2017, the "Social Contribution Department" was established for the purpose of supporting areas affected by various disasters. At the Nagoya Basho in July of the same year, a donation box was set up in the venue to support the areas affected by the heavy rains in northern Kyushu, and he said, "I hope it helps."

Fighting style
Hokutoumi was primarily an oshi-sumo specialist, preferring pushing and thrusting techniques that got his opponents out of the ring as quickly as possible. He had a powerful tachi-ai, or initial charge, and his specialty was nodowa, a single-handed push to the throat. To do this he would lock up his opponent's right arm with his left (a technique known as ottsuke) and thrust with his right. His most common winning kimarite by far were oshi-dashi and yori-kiri, which together accounted for around 60 percent of his wins at sekitori level. When fighting on the mawashi he preferred a migi-yotsu (left hand outside, right hand inside) grip. He said in an interview with Channel 4 television that the technique he most enjoyed was tsuri-dashi or lift out, although he was only credited with this kimarite once in official tournament competition (against Terao in November 1989).

Career record

See also
Glossary of sumo terms
List of sumo elders
List of past sumo wrestlers
List of sumo tournament top division champions
List of sumo tournament top division runners-up
List of sumo tournament second division champions
List of yokozuna

References

External links

Hokutoumi's basho results from January 1989
complete biography and basho results (Japanese)

1963 births
Living people
Japanese sumo wrestlers
Yokozuna
Sumo people from Hokkaido
Kokonoe stable sumo wrestlers